Sutter's Mill was a water-powered sawmill on the bank of the South Fork American River in the foothills of the Sierra Nevada in California. It was named after its owner John Sutter. A worker constructing the mill, James W. Marshall, found gold there in 1848. This discovery set off the California Gold Rush (1848–1855), a major event in the history of the United States.

The mill was later reconstructed in the original design and today forms part of Marshall Gold Discovery State Historic Park in Coloma, California. A meteorite fall in 2012 landed close to the mill; the recovered fragments were named the Sutter's Mill meteorite.

History 

The territory of Alta California, which includes modern-day California, was settled by the Viceroyalty of New Spain from 1683 onwards. It became part of an independent Mexico in 1821. John Sutter, a German-Swiss settler, arrived in the region in 1839. He established a colony at New Helvetia (now part of Sacramento), in the Central Valley. The United States conquered the region during the Mexican–American War (1846–1848): California was overrun by US forces in 1846 and a ceasefire in the region was agreed in January 1847. A peace treaty for the wider war had not yet been completed when Sutter decided to begin construction of a sawmill in the forest about 30 miles north-east of his existing colony. Sutter employed James Wilson Marshall, a carpenter originally from New Jersey, to supervise construction of the new building.

On January 24, 1848, while working on construction of the mill, Marshall found flakes of gold in the South Fork American River. On February 2, 1848, before news of the discovery had arrived, the Treaty of Guadalupe Hidalgo was signed in Mexico City. This peace treaty formally transferred sovereignty over the region to the United States. Two workers at the mill, Henry Bigler and Azariah Smith, were veterans of the Mormon Battalion and recorded their experience in journals. Bigler recorded the date when gold was discovered, January 24, 1848, in his diary. Sutter's claim to the US government for mineral rights was investigated by Joseph Libbey Folsom, who issued confirmation the gold discovery in June. The first flake found by Marshall was shipped to President James K. Polk in Washington DC, arriving in August 1848. It is now on display in the National Museum of American History, part of the Smithsonian Institution.

As news of the gold spread, settlers flocked to the new US territory of California. The population expanded from 14,000 non-natives to an estimated 85,000 newcomers in just a year. There were roughly 81,000 newcomers in 1849 and another 91,000 in 1850. Many settled at the new town of Coloma, California, which sprung up close to Sutter's Mill. Numerous further discoveries of gold in California were made. During the next seven years, approximately 300,000 people came to California (half by land and half by sea) to seek their fortunes from either mining for gold or selling supplies to the prospectors. This California Gold Rush permanently changed the territory, both through mass immigration and the economic effects of the gold. California became a US State in 1850.

Current status 

The site of the mill is part of the Marshall Gold Discovery State Historic Park, registered as California Historical Landmark number 530. The current Sutter's Mill is a replica of the original building. It was built in 1967 based on Marshall's own drawings and a photograph of the mill taken in 1850.

Meteorite 

On April 22, 2012 a meteor entered the Earth's atmosphere and exploded, showering meteorite fragments over parts of California and Nevada. The first samples of this meteorite fall were recovered close to Sutter's Mill, so it was named the Sutter's Mill meteorite. Several dozen fragments were eventually identified, with a total weight of about a kilogram. The meteorite is classified as a carbonaceous chondrite and contains some of the oldest known material in the Solar System.

In popular culture 
The mill was the namesake and inspiration for a song by singer-songwriter Dan Fogelberg. The mill was also the namesake for a song by the New Riders of the Purple Sage, and for Herb Sutter's blog. In Beverly Cleary's novel Mitch and Amy, the protagonists build a model of Sutter's Mill out of toothpicks.
Sutter's Mill is referenced heavily in an episode of Little House on the Prairie titled At the End of the Rainbow, in which Laura Ingalls Wilder and a friend believe they have found gold in a stream near Walnut Grove. It is mentioned a few other times as well.

See also 
 Sutter's Fort
 California gold coinage

References

External links 

 Discovery of Gold, by John A. Sutter, Hutchings’ California Magazine, November 1857. Sutter describes how he wanted a sawmill near the Sacramento and how Marshall told him of the gold.
 Early photographs, illustrations, and textual references to Sutter's Mill, via Calisphere, California Digital Library.
 Official site (California State Parks)

California Gold Rush
Mill
History of El Dorado County, California
Buildings and structures in El Dorado County, California
Companies based in El Dorado County, California
California Historical Landmarks
Mining museums in California
Museums in El Dorado County, California
Watermills in the United States
Sawmills in the United States